The Imperial House of France during the First French Empire consisted of the family members of Napoleon, including the House of Bonaparte, who held imperial titles as Emperor, Empress, Imperial Prince or French Prince, and who were in the order of succession to the French imperial throne in accordance with the French constitution of 1804. According to Title III, Article 9 ("The Imperial Family"), "the members of the imperial family in the order of succession, bear the title of Princes of France (princes français)" and "the eldest son of the Emperor bears the title Prince Imperial (prince impérial)."

The non-Bonapartes who were members of the imperial family were Napoleon's uncle, brother-in-law and stepson of the families Fesch, Murat and Beauharnais. This article lists their titles of the First French Empire; several held other titles in vassal states.

Members

References
  J.-F. Jules Pautet Du Parois, Nouveau manuel complet du blason ou Code héraldique, archéologique et historique avec un armorial de l'empire, une généalogie de la dynastie impériale des Bonaparte jusqu'à nos jours, etc., etc., Librairie Encyclopédique de Roret, 1854

|-

First French Empire
French royal families